Pu-Ba'lu, (another spelling, also Pu-Bahla) was ruler/mayor of Yursa, (a city/city-state in Canaan(?)), identified with Tell Jemmeh, of the 1350–1335 BC Amarna letters correspondence. His name translates in west semitic as well as in  Akkadian as: "word/mouth (of) Baal", the  'Spokesman (of) Baal' , (–or 'Baal's Voice').

Pu-Ba'lu of Yursa is the author of three letters to pharaoh. See: Yursa

The three Amarna letters, (EA for 'el Amarna') to pharaoh from Pu-Ba'lu of Yursa are:
EA 314—Title: "A shipment of glass"
EA 315—Title: "Like a command of the Sun"–See: Reanap
EA 316—Title: "Postscript to the royal scribe"–See: Tahmašši

Of the entire Amarna letters 382–letter corpus, Pu-Ba'lu of Yursa is only referenced in letters 314, and 315, as: "..Pu-Ba'lu, the ruler of Yursa", and EA 316, as "Pu-Ba'lu". One other reference in EA 104, entitled: "Ullassa taken" is to Abdi-Ashirta's son, "Pu-Bahla", presumably a separate 'Pu-Baal'.

Example letter of Pu-Ba'lu

EA 314, "A shipment of glass"
To the king-(i.e. Pharaoh), my lord, my god, my Sun, the Sun from the sky: Message of Pu-Ba'lu, your servant, the ruler of Yursa. I indeed prostrate myself at the feet of the king, my lord, my god, my Sun: the Sun from the sky, 7 times and 7 times, on the back and on the belly. I am indeed guarding the place of the king, (my) lord, my Sun, the Sun from the sky. Who is the dog g that would not o]be[y the orders of the king, the Sun from the sk]y? [Since the king, my lord, has ord[ere[d] some glass, I [s]end it to the king, my lord, my god, the Sun from the sk[y].  —EA  -314, lines 1-22 (with damaged cuneiform characters)

EA 235, entitled: "An order of glass", is of the same subject, a letter from Satatna of Akka. See also the same subject glass: Yidya of Ašqaluna, EA 323; see: Yidya.

See also
Yursa
Amarna letters–localities and their rulers
Amarna letters
Amarna letter EA 323
Satatna, and Yidya, Glass letters

External links
Pu-Baal of "Yurtsa"
Pu-Baal of "Yurtsa", a 2nd Article

References 
Moran, William L. The Amarna Letters. Johns Hopkins University Press, 1987, 1992. (softcover)

Amarna letters writers
Canaanite people
14th-century BC people